The Northgate Link tunnel is a light rail tunnel in Seattle, Washington, United States. The twin-bore Link light rail tunnel, built as part of the Northgate Link extension (formerly known as "North Link"), carries a section of the 1 Line and connects the University District to Northgate.

The tunnel begins at University of Washington station (the north end of the University Link tunnel) and travels northwest across the University of Washington campus. It serves intermediate stations at U District and Roosevelt before emerging on the east side of Interstate 5 at a portal in Maple Leaf. Light rail trains then continue on an elevated guideway to Northgate station, where the extension ends. The extension was approved in 2008 by voters in the Sound Transit 2 (ST2) package, began construction in 2012, and entered service on October 2, 2021.

Routing 

For the  Northgate Link extension project, the paired tunnels constructed for University Link continue north to the University District and the Roosevelt neighborhoods before emerging at the surface along I-5 near NE 94th Street to serve the elevated Northgate station.

An extension north to Lynnwood was approved as part of the Sound Transit 2 ballot measure in 2008, along with funding to continue planning future service all the way to Everett. The Lynnwood Link extension is scheduled to open in 2024.

The tunnel also uses  of rubber supports for "floating slabs" that cushion and absorb energy from the trains.

Stations

Construction 

Construction on the Northgate Link extension began in 2012 and opened for service on October 2, 2021. Train testing began in January 2021.

Tunnels
Each  tunnel is dug southbound, starting from the Maple Leaf Portal, in three segments separated by stations, using a  diameter tunnel boring machine. The machine digging the tunnel  for northbound trains was named "Brenda" and the sister machine for the southbound trains was named "Pamela", but the names were dropped in March 2016 to reduce associations with the troubled "Bertha" machine used on the Alaskan Way Viaduct replacement tunnel project. Brenda was previously used on the University Link Tunnel from 2011 to 2012, digging both tunnels between Capitol Hill station and the Downtown Seattle Transit Tunnel.

TBM #1 (formerly Brenda) began excavation of the northbound tunnel on July 9, 2014, and reached Roosevelt station on March 17, 2015. It later reached the U District station on November 6, 2015, and completed the entire northbound tunnel to University of Washington station on March 30, 2016, less than two weeks after light rail service to that station from Downtown Seattle had begun. TBM #1 was disassembled and removed from the University of Washington station. Due to damage sustained by TBM #2, TBM #1 was refurbished and excavated the last (southbound) tunnel segment between June and September 2016.

TBM #2 (formerly Pamela) began excavation of the southbound tunnel on November 20, 2014, and reached Roosevelt station on July 13, 2015. Repairs were made and the segment was completed on March 24, 2016. Additional repairs to TBM #2 needed to complete the final (southbound) tunnel segment would have potentially delayed the project's opening if the five months of float time were exceeded, leading JCM Northlink to finish the final segment with TBM #1.

The tunnel has 23 cross-passages between the bores that contain emergency exits, which were excavated using ground freezing.

References

External links 

 
 Sound Transit's page on Northgate Link extension

Link light rail
Railway lines opened in 2021
1500 V DC railway electrification
Tunnels completed in 2021
Railroad tunnels in Seattle